Mark John Whipple (born April 1, 1957) is an American football coach, who most recently served as offensive coordinator at Nebraska in 2022. Whipple was the head football coach at University of New Haven from 1988 to 1993, Brown University from 1994 to 1997, and stints as the University of Massachusetts Amherst (UMass), from 1998 to 2003 and 2014 to 2018.  His 1998 UMass team won the NCAA Division I-AA Football Championship.  He was the quarterbacks coach for the Cleveland Browns of the National Football League (NFL) in 2011 and 2012. Before joining the Browns in January 2011, Whipple worked for two seasons as the offensive coordinator at the University of Miami.  He previously coached in the NFL, working as a quarterback coach with the Pittsburgh Steelers from 2004 to 2006 and as an offensive assistant coach with the Philadelphia Eagles in 2007 and 2008. On January 14, 2014, Whipple returned to UMass as head coach.

Early life and playing career
Whipple was born in Tarrytown, New York before moving to Phoenix, Arizona at the age of nine. He is a graduate of Camelback High School, where he was an All-State performer in both football and baseball. Whipple was named the Arizona Scholar-Athlete of the Year in 1975.

Whipple went on to play football at Brown University, where he was a 1979 graduate with a bachelor's degree in political science. Whipple was the starting quarterback for the Bears in 1977 and 1978, leading Brown to a 13–5 record and a pair of second-place Ivy League finishes. He was a member of the Bears' 1976 Ivy League championship team, the first Ivy football championship in school history. During his three-year varsity career, he completed 175 of 340 passes for 2,365 yards and 13 touchdowns, while running for 518 yards and 10 touchdowns. A two-time honorable mention All-Ivy pick in football, Whipple also earned four varsity letters on the baseball diamond as Brown's starting shortstop. He was inducted into the Brown Athletic Hall of Fame in 1996.

Coaching career
Whipple began his coaching career as an assistant coach at St. Lawrence University in 1980, before serving as the offensive coordinator at Union College for next two seasons. In 1984, Whipple was hired as an assistant coach at his alma mater (Brown) where he worked with the wide receivers. The following season, Whipple spent as a member of the coaching staff for the United States Football League's Arizona Wranglers under George Allen, assisting with the quarterbacks.

Whipple served as the offensive coordinator at the University of New Hampshire for two years before receiving his first head coaching opportunity, as the new head coach of the University of New Haven Chargers in 1988. While at New Haven, his 1992 squad finished 12–1 and ranked No. 5 nationally. The team led all NCAA divisions in scoring offense (50.5 points per game) and total offense (587.7 yards per game). His 1993 New Haven team was named Sports Illustrated's "Best Offense in College Football" while averaging 52.5 points and 557.6 yards of total offense per game. His 1993 squad ranked as high as No. 2 nationally.

In 1994, he was hired by his alma mater to serve as head football coach at Brown University, where he spent the next four seasons. While at Brown, his 1997 squad set Ivy League and school records for total offense (474.3 yards per game) which included a single-game record of 629 yards against Yale. His 1995 team set several single-season records including most points (282), total offense (4,165 yards), passing offense (2,502 yards) and first downs (227).

In his first stint as coach of UMass from 1998 to 2003, he won the NCAA Division I-AA national title in his first season at the school. His UMass teams rewrote the record books, setting more than 40 team records. In 1998 his national championship team posted school records in points scored (524), touchdowns (73), total yards (7,074), passing yards (4,050), completions (306), and first downs (354).

Whipple left college football for a position as an assistant coach with the Pittsburgh Steelers of the NFL in 2004 where he was instrumental in the development of Ben Roethlisberger, who in his rookie season became the first NFL quarterback to finish a season undefeated with a 13–0 record in games he started. Roethlisberger later became the youngest starting quarterback to win a Super Bowl. On January 25, 2007, Whipple was let go by new Steelers head coach Mike Tomlin and replaced with Ken Anderson. The next day, Whipple was hired by the Philadelphia Eagles.

On January 7, 2009, Whipple was named the offensive coordinator at Miami. Whipple was fired along with head coach Randy Shannon, following the end of the season loss to South Florida on November 27, 2010. After coach Tom O'Brien left Boston College to coach North Carolina State, it was reported that Mark Whipple was the leading candidate to replace him.  That job eventually went to Jeff Jagodzinski.  He was reported to be the leading candidate for the Connecticut Huskies head football coach, an opening created when Randy Edsall left to replace Ralph Friedgen as the head coach at the University of Maryland, College Park following the 2010 season. However, Connecticut hired Paul Pasqualoni on January 13, 2011.

Whipple signed a contract with the Cleveland Browns on January 30, 2011 to be their quarterback coach. He was fired along with the rest of the Browns coach staff at the end of the 2012 season.

Head coaching record

References

External links
 Nebraska profile

1957 births
Living people
American football quarterbacks
Brown Bears football coaches
Brown Bears football players
Cleveland Browns coaches
Miami Hurricanes football coaches
Nebraska Cornhuskers football coaches
New Hampshire Wildcats football coaches
New Haven Chargers football coaches
Philadelphia Eagles coaches
Pittsburgh Panthers football coaches
Pittsburgh Steelers coaches
St. Lawrence Saints football coaches
UMass Minutemen football coaches
Union Dutchmen football coaches
United States Football League coaches
Sportspeople from Phoenix, Arizona
People from Tarrytown, New York
Coaches of American football from Arizona
Players of American football from Phoenix, Arizona